Derby, Illinois may refer to:
Derby, Ford County, Illinois, an unincorporated community
Derby, Saline County, Illinois, an unincorporated community